LBIA may refer to:
 An acronym of Leeds Bradford International Airport in the UK
 The ICAO code of Bezmer Air Base in Bulgaria